Events of 2019 in Somaliland.

Incumbents
President: Muse Bihi Abdi
Vice President: Abdirahman Saylici
Speaker of the Parliament: Bashe Mohamed Farah
Chairman of the House: Suleiman Mohamoud Adan
 Chief Justice: Adan Haji Ali
 Chief of Staff of Armed Forces: Nuh Ismail Tani

Events

January
January 24
The 28th Session of the Cabinet of Somaliland, chaired by the President was held at the presidential palace in Hargeisa.

February
February 789
The 6th General Assembly of ruling party Kulmiye, which was held in Borama, was elected the chairman and vice chairman of the party.

March
March 18
A delegation led by Eritrean foreign minister, Osman Saleh Mohammed arrived in Hargeisa.

April
April 29
A session of the House of Representatives, chaired by Speaker of the house, Bashe Mohamed, was approved by the Judicial System Law.

May
May 28
Civil Service Commission, the Central Bank and the Auditor General signed a tripartite agreement about civil servant management.

June
June 7
A huge fire engulfs a stores in Gobannimo Market of hargeisa.

July
July 11
Ministry of Posts and Technology has announced that it has implemented the postal services for the first time in the country.

August
August 21
the National Tender Board has announced the successful bid for the maintenance of two bridges in Burao.

September
September 18
Berbera municipality hands five military vehicles to the Minister of Interior.

October
October 12
At least 11 people have been killed and 13 injured in a car accident on the eastside outskirts of Berbera.

November
November 18
Council of Ministers approved the 2020 forecast of the National Budget.

December
December 26
President of Somaliland opened the Local Industrial Exhibition in hargeisa.

Deaths

May
May 10
Haji Abdi Warabe - member of House of Elders.

November
November 5
Abdillahi Fadal Iman - Somaliland Police Commissioner (born 1960)

References

 
2010s in Somaliland
Somaliland
Somaliland